The Xingtai earthquake  was a sequence of major earthquakes that took place between March 8 and March 29, 1966, in the area administered by the prefecture-level city of Xingtai in southern Hebei province, People's Republic of China.

The first earthquake with magnitude 6.0 on the moment magnitude scale and epicenter in Longyao County occurred in the early morning of March 8, 1966. It was followed by a sequence of five earthquakes above magnitude 6 that lasted until March 29, 1966. The strongest of these quakes had a magnitude of 6.8 and took place in the southeastern part of Ningjin County on March 22. The earthquake damage included 8,064 dead, 38,000 injured and more than 5 million destroyed houses.

Earthquakes

See also 
 List of earthquakes in 1966
 List of earthquakes in China

References

Earthquakes in China
Xingtai
Xingtai